"This Is No Dream" is a 1939 song co-written by Tommy Dorsey with Benny Davis and Ted Shapiro and released as a 78 single by his orchestra.

Tommy Dorsey and His Orchestra released the song as a Victor 78, 26234, featuring Jack Leonard on vocals in 1939. According to the tsort.info database, "This Is No Dream" reached No. 9 on the Billboard singles chart in 1939. The song was published by Bregman, Vocco, and Conn in New York.

Recordings
The song was recorded by Harry James and His Orchestra featuring Frank Sinatra on vocals. Charlie Barnet and His Orchestra also recorded the song on RCA Bluebird. 10273, with Judy Ellington on vocals.

References

Sources
Peter J. Levinson, Tommy Dorsey: Livin' in a Great Big Way: a Biography (Cambridge, MA: Da Capo Press, 2005) 
Robert L. Stockdale, Tommy Dorsey: On The Side (Metuchen, NJ: The Scarecrow Press, 1995)

External links
  Tommy Dorsey 1939 recording on the Jazz Anthology website

1939 songs
Tommy Dorsey songs
Songs written by Tommy Dorsey
Songs written by Ted Shapiro
Songs written by Benny Davis